Hugh Kennedy (1879–1936) was the Attorney-General of Ireland and Chief Justice.

Hugh Kennedy may also refer to:
 Hugh N. Kennedy (born 1947), professor in history of the Islamic Middle East
 Hugh Kennedy (New Orleans), mayor of New Orleans (1865–1866)
 Hugh Alexander Kennedy (1809–1878), British chess master and army captain

see also Hugh Kennedie Moderator of the General Assembly of the Church of Scotland 1690 to 1692